The 1967 Australia Cup Final was the sixth Australia Cup Final, the final match of the 1967 Australia Cup. It was played at the Olympic Park Stadium in Melbourne, Australia, on 30 October 1967, contested by Melbourne Hungaria and APIA Leichhardt. Hungaria won the match 4–3 after extra time, with three goals from Attila Abonyi and Frank Stoffels.

Route to the final

Yugal

APIA Leichhardt

Match

Details

References

October 1967 sports events in Australia
Soccer in Melbourne
Australia Cup (1962–1968) finals